Penrith Selective High School (PSHS) is a public co-educational academically selective secondary day school, located in Penrith, in Western Sydney, New South Wales, Australia. Established in 1950 and operated by the NSW Department of Education, the school caters for approximately 925 students from Year 7 to Year 12.

Penrith Selective High School has consistently performed among the top schools in the Higher School Certificate (HSC). The classes of 2010, 2017, and 2018 share the school's highest ranking at 27th in New South Wales, based on HSC results. In 2018, over 90 students received an Australian Tertiary Admission Rank (ATAR) of over 90 and the median ATAR was 91.95. The school also ranks well nationally, consistently placing amongst the top 15 to 20 schools in Australia based on results of the National Assessment Program (NAPLAN), a series of nationally administered tests aimed at measuring student's ability in reading, writing, spelling, grammar and punctuation, and numeracy.

History
Penrith Selective High School was first opened in the 1930s as an intermediate school on the land adjacent to its current location (now Penrith Public School). The school's location was then occupied by a mansion known as The Towers. During the 1940s, the mansion and the land was sold to the Department of Education, who demolished the mansion and built Penrith High School, which was officially established in 1950. The school became academically selective in 1989.

Two of the original foundations of the mansion have been preserved and remain in the school grounds. Additionally, the original plaque commemorating the opening of Penrith Intermediate School has been transferred into the present school grounds, where it currently resides in the school's archives. In commemoration of The Towers mansion, the annual school magazine goes by the same name.

Enrolment
The students of Penrith Selective High School come from an area extending from the Blue Mountains to North Sydney, from the Hawkesbury District to Luddenham. The school has seen significant intake from the City of Blacktown.

Year 7
All Year 7 enrolments are managed by the High Performing Students Unit (formerly, the Selective Schools Unit) of the NSW Department of Education. Each October, application forms for the selective high schools test are available from government primary schools and from the Selective Schools Unit for Year 6 students and are due to be returned that November.

Years 8–12

Applications for entry into Years 8–12 are managed by the school, in line with High Performing Students Unit guidelines. Only a small number of places are available each year since a vacancy only occur when a current student leaves the school. Application packages become available from the school's website or the Selective Schools Unit in Term 2 (June) each year and are returned to the school, along with supporting documentation, by the end of July. The deadline date for application each year is determined by the Selective Schools Unit. The selection committee arranges the applications in order of academic merit based upon the evidence submitted. The committee considers material that provides evidence of high academic achievement and participation in extracurricular activities. Residential status requirements and family placement claims follow the Year 7 entry criteria. Students must be either Australia citizens or permanent residents.

Facilities

The school has a gymnasium, a field with multi-sport goal posts (soccer and rugby, although contact sport is strictly prohibited), a smaller field with portable hockey goal posts, and two basketball courts. It also has five computer labs, an extensive two-storey library, a large space for creative and performing arts, numerous classrooms with equipment and materials dedicated to specific faculties, and a school hall which is part of the original school structure, built in the early 1950s. The hall can accommodate approximately 450 seated guests, usually used for official school functions, performing arts exhibitions, and information evenings. The Penrith Selective High School Parents and Citizens Association (P&C) operates a school canteen, from which all proceeds go towards improving the educational experience of PSHS students.

House system

At the beginning of Year 7, all Penrith Selective High School students are placed in one of the following four houses, sorted by last name:

Every year three sporting carnivals (Swimming, Athletics, and Cross Country) are held, where students compete to earn house points. Students also compete for points throughout the year during numerous inter-house friendly competitions, including dance-offs and halloween performances. The winner of each carnival and of the overall house championship is announced each year.

Staff
As of 2020, the staff at Penrith High School includes the following:

Senior executive

 Principal – Mark Long

HSC cheating scandal

In September 2015, Penrith High School drew controversy after it was discovered that some students had obtained the login information of a teacher and potentially tried to have their marks digitally altered for their HSC, with the school captain being among those involved. This was followed by an investigation from the Department of Education, though its conclusions are unknown.

Notable people

Linda Burney – former Member of the New South Wales Parliament for Canterbury, and current Member of the Australian Parliament for Barton
Joyce Fardell – former teacher librarian
Tony Lauer  – former Commissioner of the New South Wales Police
Ognjen Matic – Australian handball player
Grigor Taylor – actor, Matlock Police, Silent Number and Glenview High
Ray Watson  – judge who reformed family law to create no-fault divorce
Penelope Wensley  – former Governor of Queensland
Richard Wilson – actor, The Proposition and Clubland

See also

 List of government schools in New South Wales
 List of selective high schools in New South Wales
 Jamison High School

References

External links
 Penrith Selective High School website

Public high schools in Sydney
Educational institutions established in 1950
1950 establishments in Australia
Penrith, New South Wales
Selective schools in New South Wales